Abraham Jeriel Richard Dorsett (born 4 May 2002) is an English professional footballer who plays as a defender for Kilmarnock, on loan from Reading.

Career
On 21 October 2019, Dorsett signed his first professional contract with Reading. Dorsett made his professional debut with Reading in a 1-0 FA Cup loss to Luton Town F.C. on 9 January 2021.

On 20 August 2021, Dorsett joined Rochdale on a season long loan. He was then loaned to Kilmarnock in August 2022.

Career statistics

Club

References

External links
 

2002 births
Living people
English footballers
England youth international footballers
Association football defenders
Reading F.C. players
Rochdale A.F.C. players
Black British sportspeople
Kilmarnock F.C. players
Scottish Professional Football League players
English Football League players